A block chord is a chord or voicing built directly below the melody either on the strong beats or to create a four-part harmonized melody line in "locked-hands" rhythmic unison with the melody, as opposed to broken chords. This latter style, known as Shearing voicing, was popularized by George Shearing, but originated with Phil Moore.

Block chord style (also known as chorale style) uses simple chordal harmony in which "the notes of each chord may be played all at once" as opposed to being "played one at a time (broken or arpeggiated chords). For example, a guitarist can strum the chord (this would be a "block" chord) or use a picking style to play "broken" chords".

Notes

Sources

Further reading
 

Chords
Jazz techniques
Voicing (music)
Jazz terminology